Chakhchakh-Kazmalyar is a rural locality (a selo) in Magaramkentsky District, Republic of Dagestan, Russia. The population was 1,927 as of 2010. There are 27 streets.

Geography 
Chakhchakh-Kazmalyar is located 29 km northeast of Magaramkent (the district's administrative centre) by road, on the left bank of the Samur River. Tagirkent-Kazmalyar and Kchun-Kazmalyar are the nearest rural localities.

Nationalities 
Lezgins live there.

References 

Rural localities in Magaramkentsky District